BuildMaster is an application release automation  tool, designed by the software development team Inedo. It combines build management and ARA capabilities to manage and automate processes primarily related to continuous integration, database change scripts, and production deployments, overall releasing applications reliably. The tool is browser-based and able to be used "out-of-the-box". Its feature set and scope puts it in line with the DevOps movement, and is marketed as "more than a release automatigs together the people, processes, and practices that allow teams to deliver software rapidly, reliably, and responsibly.” It's a tool that embodies incremental DevOps adoption.

BuildMaster is configured entirely through its UI, as opposed to scripts or XML-based configuration files. Although the primary web application is Windows-only, BuildMaster orchestrates Windows or Linux-based servers to perform various build-release-deploy actions. BuildMaster also has a tight integration with PowerShell and is often used along with other DevOps tools.

Main features 
The main features of BuildMaster are:

Pipelines as Code – Pivot between Visual mode and the JSON Text editor
Global Pipeline – Reusability across releases and applications
Database Changes – Use BuildMaster to ensure sensitive information is protected and associate connection string with environment
Issue tracking Integration – Tight integration with variety of issue tracker and built-in including JIRA, GitHub, TFS, and YouTrack
Pipeline Gates – Mix of manual and automated approvals that unless approved prevent advancement to next pipeline stage
Deployment Plans – Drag-and –drop visual user interface that may also be edited in text mode (code view)
PowerShell Integration – First class integration with PowerShell and Shell for support of both Windows and Linux.
Event Listener – Useful for monitoring action and operations
Configuration Variables – Add flexibility when modeling deployment plans
Release Packages – Flexibility by uploading manually, pushed from CI server such as TeamCity or TFS, created within BuildMaster or Pushed from ProGet
 Configuration File Management - enables configuration files to be defined with multiple instances (such as one per environment) in a version-controlled manner with file deployments logged
 Continuous Integration - support for CI tools including Jenkins, TFS, and TeamCity
 Infrastructure Configuration Sync - visualize the infrastructure (servers and environments) that  pipelines target
 Resource Credentials - manage, store, and control access to tokens, passwords, and API Key that are involved in deployments

Highlights  
Highlights include:
A simple, plan editor that allows for code or drag and drop interface
Intuitive UI that enables quick implementation
 Strong support for .NET applications Microsoft Windows

Some notable BuildMaster Users include University Hospitals of Cleveland, University of Nebraska-Lincoln, Allrecipes, and UCHealth.

Development company culture 
Of interest also is the corporate culture where BuildMaster was developed.  Its producer Inedo were cited in the creation of the software development card game Release!, and have been cited in several sources that their products are developed as much by the coding work that went into them, as the sense of community that an office gaming culture has established.

See also 
 Software build automation
 Continuous Integration
 DevOps
 Application release automation
DevOps toolchain

References 

Build automation
Continuous integration